Major General Eric W. Vollmecke is a retired United States Air Force general. He was the Air National Guard Mobilization Assistant to the Commander, United States Air Forces in Europe/Air Forces Africa and was formerly the Assistant Adjutant General - Air in the West Virginia National Guard.

Military career
Vollmecke entered the Air Force as a communications officer where he later served at Headquarters, United States Air Force Staff leading system development initiatives on the Worldwide Military Command and Control System. He has maintained his communications background through his civilian occupation.

In 1987, he joined the West Virginia Air National Guard and was selected to attend pilot training. Since then, he has risen from C-130 mission pilot through flight commander, squadron commander, director of operations and wing commander to his present position, while also balancing a corporate career. During his tenure as wing commander, he oversaw an enormous program to transform the base and transition its personnel from the tactical to the strategic airlift mission. Highlights of his career include a reserve officer exchange tour, during which he flew operational missions with the Royal Air Force in Africa. General Vollmecke has flown combat missions in Panama, Desert Shield/Storm, Bosnia, Kosovo, Operation Enduring Freedom and Operation Iraqi Freedom. After 11 September 2001, he led the 167th Airlift Wing on two deployments supporting combat operations for Operation Enduring Freedom. During initial stages of Operation Iraqi Freedom, he served as Chief of Staff for the Director of Mobility Forces for United States Central Command in the Combined Air Operations Center. In 2005, he was selected to command the 451st Air Expeditionary Group at Kandahar Airbase, Afghanistan.

In September 2017, he retired from the Air Force.

Civilian occupation and professional affiliations
General Vollmecke serves as the Managing Director for North American Operations for a medical device manufacturer. He is responsible for building the company's partnerships and alliances for new joint ventures throughout the world. Additionally, he leads the company's global research and product development strategy working closely with the company's major manufacturing facilities in Germany and China.

Professional affiliations include membership in the National Guard Association of West Virginia, the National Guard Association of the United States and the Association of Information Technology Professionals.

Personal life 
General Vollmecke's younger brother, Kirk Vollmecke, is a Major General in the US Army.

Education
1982 The Citadel, Bachelor of Arts, Mathematics, Charleston, South Carolina
1988 George Washington University, Master of Business Administration, Washington, D.C.
2000 Air War College, by correspondence
2010 George C. Marshall European Center for Security Studies, Senior Executive Seminar, Garmisch, Germany
2011 CAPSTONE General and Flag Officer Course, National Defense University, Fort Lesley J. McNair, Washington, D.C.

Assignments
Nov 1982 – Apr 1983, Student, Computer Systems Development Training, Keesler Air Force Base, Mississippi
Apr 1983 – Apr 1984, Computer Systems Planning Officer, Air Force Data Services Center, The Pentagon, Washington, D.C.
Apr 1984 – Oct 1984, Computer Systems Planning Officer, 1st Information Systems Group, The Pentagon, Washington, D.C.
Oct 1984 – Apr 1985, Command and Control Programming Resources Officer, The Pentagon, Washington, D.C.
Apr 1985 – Aug 1987, Programs and Resources Officer, Headquarters, United States Air Force, The Pentagon, Washington, D.C.
Aug 1987 – Nov 1988, Student, Undergraduate Pilot Training, Reese Air Force Base, Texas
Nov 1988 – Nov 1992, Co-Pilot, C-130, 167th Tactical Airlift Squadron, Martinsburg, West Virginia
Nov 1992 – Nov 1993, Assistant Flight Commander, C-130, 167th Airlift Squadron, Martinsburg, West Virginia
Nov 1994 – Nov 1998, Pilot, C-130, 167th Airlift Squadron, Martinsburg, West Virginia
Nov 1998 – Oct 2002, Commander, 167th Airlift Squadron, Martinsburg, West Virginia
Oct 2002 – Jan 2004, Air Operations Staff Director, Headquarters, West Virginia Air National Guard, Charleston, West Virginia
Jan 2004 – Jan 2005, Commander, 167th Airlift Wing, Martinsburg, West Virginia
Oct 2007 – Oct 2011, Chief of Staff, Headquarters, West Virginia Air National Guard, Charleston, West Virginia
Aug 2009 – Jul 2012, (A5), Assistant to the Director, Air National Guard, Arlington, Virginia
Oct 2011 – Aug 2012, Assistant Adjutant General-Air, West Virginia National Guard, Charleston, West Virginia
Sep 2012 – Sep 2017, Air National Guard Assistant to the Commander, United States Air Forces in Europe/Air Forces Africa, Ramstein Air Force Base, Germany
Sep 2017 - Retired from USAF & WV ANG.

Flight information

Awards and decorations

Effective dates of promotion

References 

Brigadier General Eric W. Vollmecke, Official Biography

Living people
The Citadel, The Military College of South Carolina alumni
George Washington University School of Business alumni
Recipients of the Legion of Merit
Recipients of the Air Medal
West Virginia National Guard personnel
United States Air Force generals
National Guard (United States) generals
Year of birth missing (living people)
Recipients of the Meritorious Service Medal (United States)